Hemiandra linearis, commonly known as speckled snakebush,<ref name=FloraBase>{{FloraBase|name=Hemiandra linearis'|id=6838 }}</ref> is a species of prostrate to ascending shrub that is endemic to the south-west of Western Australia.

Flowering occurs from October to November or December.

TaxonomyHemiandra linearis was formally described in 1837 by George Bentham in Stephan Endlicher's Enumeratio plantarum quas in Novae Hollandiae ora austro-occidentali ad fluvium Cygnorum et in sinu Regis Georgii collegit Carolus Liber Baro de Hügel'' from material collected near the Swan River by Charles von Hügel.

Distribution and habitat
This hemiandra grows in sand in the Avon Wheatbelt, Geraldton Sandplains, Jarrah Forest and Swan Coastal Plain biogeographic regions in the south-west of Western Australia.

Conservation status
This species is classified as "not threatened" by the Department of Environment and Conservation (Western Australia).

References

Eudicots of Western Australia
Lamiaceae
Lamiales of Australia
Plants described in 1837
Taxa named by George Bentham